Robert Cumming may refer to:

 Robert Cumming (artist) (born 1943), American painter, sculptor, photographer, and printmaker
 Robert Cumming (art historian) (born 1945), professor of the history of art at Boston University
 Robert Denoon Cumming (1916–2004), Canadian-American philosopher and historian of philosophy

See also 
 Robert Cummings (disambiguation)